Marie-Angélique Memmie Le Blanc (1712 in Wisconsin?, French Louisiana – 15 December 1775 in Paris, France) was a famous feral child of the 18th century in France who was known as The Wild Girl of Champagne, The Maid of Châlons, or The Wild Child of Songy.

Her case is more controversial than that of some other feral children because a few modern-day scholars have regarded it as either wholly or partly fictional. However, in 2004, the French author Serge Aroles argued that it was indeed authentic, after spending ten years carrying out archival research into French and American history.

Aroles speculates that Marie-Angélique had survived for ten years living wild in the forests of France, between the ages of nine and 19, before she was captured by villagers in Songy in Champagne in September 1731. He claims that she was born in 1712 as a Native American of the Meskwaki (or "Fox") people in what today is the Midwestern U.S. state of Wisconsin and that she died in Paris in 1775, aged 63. Aroles found archival documents showing that she learned to read and write as an adult, thus making her unique among feral children.

Contemporary accounts
The story of Marie-Angélique's life in the wild was publicised in the mid-18th century in both France and in Britain through a short pamphlet biography of her by the French writer Marie-Catherine Homassel Hecquet edited by the French scientist-explorer Charles-Marie de la Condamine and published in Paris in 1755. This appeared in an English translation in 1768 as An Account of a Savage Girl, Caught Wild in the Woods of Champagne. However, it was not  error-free since it gave Marie-Angélique's age at the time of her capture as ten although it is now speculated to have been nineteen.

Interviews with Marie-Angélique herself were recorded by the French royal courtier and diarist Charles-Philippe d’Albert, Duc de Luynes (1753), the French poet Louis Racine (c. 1755) and the Scottish philosopher-judge James Burnett, Lord Monboddo (1765). In addition, accounts of her were published by the French naturalists Georges-Louis Leclerc, Comte de Buffon (1759) and Jacques-Christophe Valmont de Bomare (1768), Lord Monboddo (1768) (1773) and (1795), the Châlons lawyer-antiquary Claude-Rémy Buirette de Verrières (1788) and the French historian Abel Hugo (1835).

Marie-Catherine Homassel Hecquet
Marie-Catherine Homassel-Hecquet (June 12, 1686 – 8 July 1764) was a French biographical author of the first half of the 18th century. She was the wife of the Abbeville merchant Jacques Homassel and the semi-anonymous "Madame H–––t" who published a pamphlet biography of the famous feral child Marie-Angélique Memmie Le Blanc, Histoire d'une jeune fille sauvage trouvée dans les bois à l’âge de dix ans, in Paris in 1755. This appeared in an English translation in 1768 as An Account of a Savage Girl, with a preface by the Scottish philosopher-judge James Burnett, Lord Monboddo, which anticipates some of the later evolutionary theories of the English scientist Charles Darwin.

However, just how much of Histoire d'une jeune fille sauvage Hecquet herself wrote is not clear and the work has sometimes been attributed to the French scientist-explorer Charles-Marie de la Condamine, even though La Condamine himself publicly denied its authorship. The biography was advertised in Paris in 1755 as "Brochure in-12 de 72 pag. Prix 1 liv." ("Pamphlet in duodecimo of 72 pages. Price 1 French livre") and was sold in shops in the city in order to provide a small income for Marie-Angélique herself.

At the time, La Condamine described Hecquet as "a widow, who lives near St. Marceau and, having met and befriended the girl after the death of M. the Duke d’Orleans who was protecting her, took pains to write her story".
Very little else is known about her other than that she was a correspondent and former childhood friend of Marie-Andrée Regnard Duplessis (1687–1760), a nun and mother superior of the Hôtel-Dieu convent in Quebec in Canada. In later life she is believed to have gone into a religious retreat at an unknown location, perhaps as a nun.

Modern assessments
The story of Marie-Angélique's life remains little-known in English-speaking countries and appeared to have been almost forgotten in France until quite recently, with the publication of Julia Douthwaite's articles and book. It was featured in broadcasts by the French radio channel Europe1 in 2011 and by the France Inter channel in 2012.

The French surgeon-author Serge Aroles summarizes Marie-Angélique's life in his second book, L’Enigme des enfants-loups: Une certitude biologique mais un déni des archives 1304–1954 (Paris, Editions Publibook, 2007):

These archives [those studied by Aroles himself] suggest that the only feral child to have survived in the forests for as long as ten years without irreversible deterioration of body or mind was an Amerindian of the 'Renards' or 'Fox' people. She was brought to France from Canada by a lady who unfortunately arrived [by ship] in Marseille during the bubonic plague epidemic in Provence in 1720.

Having escaped the plague that should have killed her, Marie-Angélique walked thousands of kilometers [miles] through the forests of the kingdom of France before being captured in 1731 in the province of Champagne in a state of savagery. During these ten years, she did not live with wolves, but survived them by resisting their attacks with a wooden club and another weapon [a long stick with a sharp metal tip] that she either found or stole. When she was captured, this black-skinned, hairy and clawed huntress was showing some characteristics of regression (she knelt down to drink water and had regular sideways eye movements, similar to nystagmus, the result of a life lived in a state of permanent alertness). However, this girl overcame an extreme challenge harder than the cold, wolves, or hunger: she recovered the faculty of human speech after ten years of mutism.

Despite Aroles' speculation that she was 19 years old when she was captured, a printed text [Hecquet's Histoire d’une jeune fille sauvage] claimed that she was ten. Her intellectual rebirth was important: she learned to read and write, became a nun for a time in a royal abbey, became destitute, was rescued financially by the Queen of France (spouse of Louis XV), maintained her dignity in the face of her long battle with an illness, and died relatively wealthy, as the inventory of her goods shows.

The Scottish philosopher Monboddo, who interviewed Marie-Angélique in 1765, considered her to be the most extraordinary person of his time. However, this woman was forgotten; she disappears, for more than two centuries, behind all the heroines of fiction.

In September 2002, the University of Chicago Press published the first scholarly book on this case, by Julia V. Douthwaite, "The Wild Girl, Natural Man, and the Monster: Dangerous Experiments in the Age of Enlightenment".
In January 2015, the Paris publisher Editions Delcourt published a comic book based on Marie-Angélique's life, Sauvage: Biographie de Marie-Angélique le Blanc, written by Jean David Morvan and Aurélie Beviere and illustrated by Gaëlle Hersent.

References

Further reading
Benzaquén, Adriana S., Encounters with Wild Children: Temptation and Disappointment in the Study of Human Nature (Montreal, McGill-Queen's University Press, 2006)
Strivay, Lucienne, Enfants sauvages: Approches anthropologiques (Paris, Editions Gallimard, 2006)
Calder, Martin, Encounters with the Other: A Journey to the Limits of Language Through Works by Rousseau, Defoe, Prévoust and Graffigny (Faux Titre 234) (Amsterdam/New York, Editions Rodopi, 2003)
Douthwaite, Julia V., "Les sciences de l'homme au 18e siècle: Le parcours de la jeune fille sauvage de Champagne," Pour l’histoire des sciences de l’homme, 27 (automne-hiver, 2004): 46–53.
Douthwaite, Julia V., "Rewriting the Savage: The Extraordinary Fictions of the "Wild Girl of Champagne," Eighteenth-Century Studies 28, 2 (Winter 1994–95): 163–192.
Douthwaite, Julia V., The Wild Girl, Natural Man, and the Monster: Dangerous Experiments in the Age of Enlightenment (Chicago, University of Chicago Press, 2002), pp. 29–53
Newton, Michael, Savage Girls and Wild Boys: A History of Feral Children (London, Thomas Dunne Books/St Martin's Press, 2002; repr. London, Picador, 2004)
 Hecquet, Marie-Catherine H., La niña salvaje. Marie-Angélique Memmie Le Blanc o Historia de una niña salvaje encontrada en los bosques a la edad de diez años, edition, translation and study by Jesús García Rodríguez, Logroño, Pepitas de calabaza, 2021, 208 p. (ISBN 978-84-17386-68-9). (Translation in Spanish of the text by Hecquet and many other contemporary texts, with an introductory study). 
Cayre, Anne, La fille sauvage de Songy, novel, (L'Harmattan, 2013)
McDonnell, Kathleen, Swim Home: Searching for the Wild Girl of Champagne (Victoria, BC, FriesenPress, 2020) (ISBN 978-1525568480)
Steel, Karl, "The Adapted Words of Memmie Le Blanc," Lapham's Quarterly Roundtable July 6, 2021

External links

 French comic-book artists' blog about Marie-Angélique Memmie Le Blanc 

18th-century women
1712 births
1775 deaths
Feral children
Native American people from Wisconsin
18th-century French people
18th-century Native Americans